Latour-Bas-Elne is a commune in the Pyrénées-Orientales department in southern France.

Geography 
Latour-Bas-Elne is located in the canton of La Plaine d'Illibéris and in the arrondissement of Perpignan.

Population

See also
Communes of the Pyrénées-Orientales department

References

Communes of Pyrénées-Orientales